Iván Helguera Bujía (born 28 March 1975) is a Spanish former professional footballer.

Playing as either a central defender or defensive midfielder, with both good defensive and offensive skills, he represented five clubs during his professional career, notably Real Madrid – achieving team success as an important player – and Valencia. During his early 20s, he also had an unassuming abroad spell with Roma, and he amassed La Liga totals of 291 games and 21 goals over 11 seasons.

A Spanish international on nearly 50 occasions, Helguera represented the country at the 2002 World Cup and in two European Championships.

Club career

Early years and Real Madrid
Born in Santander, Cantabria, Helguera started playing professionally for Manchego CF and Albacete Balompié, appearing in 14 Segunda División games in the 1996–97 season for the latter. He was purchased by Serie A side A.S. Roma after that, alongside compatriot César Gómez, but left after one disappointing campaign to join RCD Espanyol, where his stellar performances led to a Real Madrid deal even before 1998–99 had finished.

With Real Madrid from July 1999, Helguera was an instant first choice, and scored five and six La Liga goals in his second and fourth seasons (both ended with the national championship conquest) alternating between defender and midfielder. He was also instrumental in the capital team's two UEFA Champions League conquests: in the 2000 final, against fellow Spaniards Valencia CF, he started the match as a sweeper in a 3–0 win, appearing as stopper two years later in the 2–1 victory over Bayer 04 Leverkusen.

Not a starter in his final two years, Helguera still made a total of 42 appearances, scoring in a 3–1 away defeat of Gimnàstic de Tarragona on 28 October 2006. At the start of his last season he was surprisingly stripped of his No. 6 jersey which went to new signing Mahamadou Diarra, given No. 21 and made to train with the youth team in anticipation of his leaving the Santiago Bernabéu Stadium, even though his contract ended in June 2009. However, he later managed to fight his way back into the starting eleven, being somewhat influential in helping the club to the 2007 domestic league.

Valencia
On 20 July 2007, Helguera signed for Valencia on a three-year deal – upon joining, he stated that he had wanted to come to Valencia for a "long time" and was "delighted" to arrive at the club. He was relatively important during his debut campaign, also helping the Che to win the Copa del Rey.

However, after having appeared very rarely in the first part of the following season, Helguera's contract was cancelled on 12 December 2008, and both FC Dinamo București and Los Angeles Galaxy declared interest in signing the player, but nothing came of it and he retired from football later that year.

International career
Helguera was capped 47 times for Spain, the first coming on 18 November 1998 in an away friendly with Italy (2–2). He played for his country at UEFA Euro 2000, the 2002 FIFA World Cup and Euro 2004, missing the 2006 World Cup after being omitted from the squad in the months before the tournament by national team coach Luis Aragonés.

Personal life
Helguera's younger brother, Luis, was also a professional footballer. A midfielder, he played in the first division for Real Zaragoza and Deportivo Alavés, and also in Italy.

He married his longtime girlfriend Lorena, and welcomed his first baby, a boy named Luca, on 30 November 2005.

Career statistics

Club

International

Scores and results list Spain's goal tally first, score column indicates score after each Helguera goal.

Honours
Real Madrid
La Liga: 2000–01, 2002–03, 2006–07
Supercopa de España: 2003
UEFA Champions League: 1999–2000, 2001–02
Intercontinental Cup: 2002
UEFA Super Cup: 2002

Valencia
Copa del Rey: 2007–08

References

External links
 
 
 

1975 births
Living people
Spanish footballers
Footballers from Santander, Spain
Association football defenders
Association football midfielders
La Liga players
Segunda División players
Segunda División B players
Tercera División players
Rayo Cantabria players
Albacete Balompié players
RCD Espanyol footballers
Real Madrid CF players
Valencia CF players
Serie A players
A.S. Roma players
UEFA Champions League winning players
Spain international footballers
UEFA Euro 2000 players
2002 FIFA World Cup players
UEFA Euro 2004 players
Spanish expatriate footballers
Expatriate footballers in Italy
Spanish expatriate sportspeople in Italy
Spanish football managers
Segunda División B managers